Albert Lee "Al" Crow (August 20, 1932 – September 12, 2019) was a professional American football player for the American Football League's Boston Patriots. He played in three games in the 1960 season after his collegiate career at William & Mary.

References

1932 births
2019 deaths
American football defensive tackles
Boston Patriots players
Players of American football from Norfolk, Virginia
William & Mary Tribe football players